The 2005 Vuelta a Andalucía was the 51st edition of the Vuelta a Andalucía cycle race and was held on 13 February to 17 February 2005. The race started in Benalmádena and finished in Chiclana de la Frontera. The race was won by Francisco Cabello.

Teams
Fifteen teams of seven riders started the race:

 
 
 
 
 
 
 
 
 
 
 
 
 
 
 Kaiku

General classification

References

Vuelta a Andalucia
Vuelta a Andalucía by year
2005 in Spanish sport